Michelle Ogundehin is a British magazine editor, creative consultant, TV presenter, and author known for writing and presenting on interior design.

Biography 
Ogundehin was born in Manchester and grew up in London, United Kingdom. She studied Architecture at the Bartlett School of Architecture graduating in 1989 with a Bachelors and a further Diploma in Architecture in 1993. Michelle moved to Brighton, after visiting for a weekend break, and has been recognised for her influence by being included in the Powerlist of influential mixed parentage Britons on a number of occasions, including in the Top 10.

In 1997, Ogundehin began working at ELLE Decoration UK, a publication dedicated to interior design, and was appointed Editor-in-Chief in 2004, for which at the 2011 PPAAwards, ELLE Decoration was awarded Specialist Consumer Magazine of the Year and Michelle was Highly Commended as Editor of the Year. In 2002, Ogundehin established her own creative consultancy, MO:Studio. From 2008 to 2015 she became a Trustee for the Victoria & Albert Museum and was made an Ambassador for Diversity in Public Appointments by the Government Equalities Office the following year.

Ogundehin has also regularly written for publications such as the Financial Times and The Observer, and in 2017 she stepped down from her role at ELLE Decorations after 13 years.

In addition to her written work, Ogundehin has worked on a number of television shows including presenting alongside Kevin McCloud on Grand Designs:House of the Year awarding homes across the UK for their architectural merit, been a guest judge on The Great Interior Design Challenge, and in 2019 began presenting as Head Judge on Interior Design Masters in which amateur interior designers compete to win a commercial contract.

Michelle's first book, Happy Inside: How to Harness the Power of Home for Health and Happiness, was published in 2020.

Filmography

Television

Bibliography

Non-fiction
 Happy Inside : London: Ebury Press: 2020:

References

External links 
 

Living people
English television presenters
People from Manchester
Year of birth missing (living people)
Black British television personalities